"La Valse de Madame Sosten" is the A-side of the 78-RPM single #17000, recorded by Joe Falcon and Cléoma Breaux in 1934. Side B contains "Mes Yeux Bleus" sung by his wife, Cleoma Falcon.

Content
Madame Sosten or "Sosthene" refers to Sosthene Falcon's wife Josephine Trahan. Sosthene Falcon is Joe's older uncle. The song deals with Josephine's daughter, Alida, who is the love interest of a much older man. He begs her parents to have her, even at the point of elopement (taking her through the window).

Lyrics

References

1934 songs
Cajun folk songs